Swap regret is a concept from game theory.  It is a generalization of regret in a repeated, n-decision game.

Definition
A player's swap-regret is defined to be the following:

 

Intuitively, it is how much a player could improve by switching each occurrence of decision i to the best decision j possible in hindsight. The swap regret is always nonnegative. Swap regret is useful for computing correlated equilibria.

References
.

Game theory